Cameron is a small lunar impact crater that lies across the northwest rim of the crater Taruntius. It was named after American astronomer Robert Curry Cameron, by his wife, lunar specialist Winifred Cameron. This formation is circular and cup-shaped, with no particular distinguishing features. It was previously designated Taruntius C.

References

 
 
 
 
 
 
 
 
 
 
 

Impact craters on the Moon